Jan Bouman (28 August 1706, in Amsterdam – 6 September 1776, in Berlin) was a Dutch architect, mainly notable for his work as designer and general contractor on the Dutch Quarter in Potsdam by order of Frederick William I of Prussia. 

He designed its canals and squares along with Potsdam's Berlin Gate and town hall, the latter influenced by the Royal Palace of Amsterdam.

External links
https://rkd.nl/nl/explore/artists/333640

18th-century Dutch architects
1706 births
1776 deaths
Architects from Amsterdam
18th-century Dutch artists